The following Confederate States Army units and commanders fought in the Battle of Fredericksburg of the American Civil War. Order of battle compiled from the army organization during the campaign. The Union order of battle is listed separately.

Abbreviations used

Military rank
 Gen = General
 LTG = Lieutenant General
 MG = Major General
 BG = Brigadier General
 Col = Colonel
 Ltc = Lieutenant Colonel
 Maj = Major
 Cpt = Captain
 Lt = Lieutenant
 Sgt = Sergeant

Other
 w = wounded
 mw = mortally wounded
 k =killed
 c = captured

Army of Northern Virginia

Gen Robert E. Lee, Commanding

First Corps

LTG James Longstreet

Second Corps

LTG Thomas J. Jackson

Reserve Artillery
BG William N. Pendleton

Cavalry

Notes

References
 U.S. War Department, The War of the Rebellion: a Compilation of the Official Records of the Union and Confederate Armies, U.S. Government Printing Office, 1880–1901.
National Park Service: Fredericksburg & Spotsylvania National Military Park (Fredericksburg Confederate order of battle).
Civil War Home: Fredericksburg Confederate order of battle 

American Civil War orders of battle